General elections were held in Singapore on 3 November 2001. President S.R. Nathan dissolved parliament on 18 October 2001 on the advice of Prime Minister Goh Chok Tong. The ruling People's Action Party (PAP) won 82 of the 84 elected seats in Parliament. Due to the large number (51) of uncontested seats, only 675,306 of the 2,036,923 eligible voters (33.2%) had an opportunity to vote. As of the recent election in 2020, this was the most recent, and fourth overall (third consecutive) election PAP returned to power on nomination day with a majority of uncontested walkovers. 

This election marked the first time that total eligible voter population exceeded the 2 million mark.

Background
The ruling PAP's secretary-general and Prime Minister Goh Chok Tong initially scheduled for the election to be held in 2002, but pushed to November after Singapore faced an economic crisis due to the events of September 11 attacks in the United States.

For the first time since 1963, a formal political umbrella emerged from within the opposition. The four-party Singapore Democratic Alliance (SDA), which consist of the leader party Singapore People's Party (SPP), the National Solidarity Party (NSP), Pertubuhan Kebangsaan Melayu Singapura (PKMS) and Singapore Justice Party (SJP), was led by Chiam See Tong. SDA fielded the most candidates in the election, where NSP provided the bulk of nine candidates, SPP with four, and PKMS providing a required minority candidate.

Former Workers' Party (WP) Non-Constituency Member of Parliament Joshua Benjamin Jeyaretnam, who lost his seat after being declared a bankrupt owing to lawsuits by PAP leaders, resigned from the party, citing disagreements with the present leadership. The only WP Member of Parliament, Low Thia Khiang took over as secretary-general. During nomination day, WP was nominated on only two wards (Hougang and Nee Soon East SMC), as their sole GRC team who attempt to nominate in Aljunied Group Representation Constituency was disqualified for filing incomplete papers.

A seat had been vacated in 1999 after the conviction of Jalan Besar GRC's MP Choo Wee Khiang over commercial crimes, but no by-election was held as the seat was within a GRC. Under the law, an entire electoral constituency (for both single member and GRC seats) has to be vacated before a by-election could be called, as this was done during the Marine Parade GRC by-election of 1992.

Campaign
This election saw its shortest campaigning period of 17 days after opening of the register of electors, as well as the absence of four-member GRCs from the electoral map (four-member GRCs would reappear again in the 2011 elections, in nearly a decade later). Another increase of the election deposit amount this time was the most significant one in history, which almost doubled.

The result saw WP's Low and SDA's Chiam retaining their seats, but saw their winning margins slashed from the 1997. With these two opposition wins, one NCMP seat was offered to and accepted by Steve Chia of Singapore Democratic Alliance, who became the youngest and first-ever non-WP NCMP.

Chee Soon Juan incident
Singapore Democratic Party (SDP) leader Chee Soon Juan came under fire in the media when he encountered Prime Minister Goh while campaigning at a hawker centre. He used a megaphone to ask Goh, "Where is the $18 billion that you have lent to (Indonesian President) Suharto?". Goh and Senior Minister Lee Kuan Yew sued Chee for defamation shortly after the election. 

Chee lost the lawsuits and was ordered to pay damages of S$300,000 to Goh and S$200,000 to Lee. On 10 February 2006, Chee was declared bankrupt by the High Court after failing to pay the damages owed to Goh and Lee, and was unable to stand in the elections held later May that year, until on 23 November 2012 where Chee was discharged from bankruptcy, and later returned to participate in the 2015 elections.

Timeline

Electoral boundaries

Outgoing/New MPs
There were a total of 40 (25 PAP) candidates making their political debut in the 2001 election. Among the new faces were Tharman Shanmugaratnam and Halimah Yacob who would later become future Senior Minister and President of Singapore, respectively. 24 incumbent MPs retired prior to the announcements. 15 candidates outside PAP were also new, among which new faces include Chee Siok Chin, sister of the SDP's leader Chee Soon Juan, as well as Desmond Lim, who would later lead the newly formed SDA in future years, and a future Perennial candidate Ooi Boon Ewe.

 Richard Hu initially announced that he would seek another term in leading a team for the new Holland–Bukit Panjang GRC, but the idea was scrapped.

Results
PAP won a landslide victory and its best result since 1980. The party achieved its third highest score among the general elections it has contested since 1959. The PAP's vote percentage of 75.3% signalled an overwhelming endorsement of the PAP to lead the nation out of the crisis that came at a time of great uncertainty over world security and the recession that came after the September 11 attacks.

By constituency

Notes

References

"Hsien Loong: Election soon". (8 November 2005). New Straits Times, p. 31.

External links
Singapore Elections Webpage

2001
2001 elections in Asia
General election
November 2001 events in Asia